Helensvale railway station is a major public transport interchange in the Gold Coast suburb of Helensvale. Helensvale railway station is served by the Queensland Rail Citytrain network Gold Coast line, G:link light rail and Surfside Buslines bus services.

History
Helensvale station opened on 25 February 1996 as the terminus of the Gold Coast line from Beenleigh. The line was later extended to Nerang on 16 December 1997. When opened, Helensvale station was also served by a CountryLink road coach service from Murwillumbah, this was diverted when the line was extended south.

A track duplication to the north of the station, linking with Coomera, was completed in October 2017. The new track provides additional capacity in time for the 2018 Commonwealth Games. The duplication required the construction of eight new rail bridges, including one with a span of 860 metres across the Coomera River, Hope Island Road and Saltwater Creek.

On 18 December 2017, Helensvale became the northern terminus of the G:link light rail line with an additional two platforms opening.

Train Services
Helensvale is served by Gold Coast line services from Varsity Lakes to Bowen Hills, Doomben and Brisbane Airport Domestic.

Services by platform

Bus connections
Surfside Buslines operate eleven routes from Helensvale station:
704: to Sea World via Southport and Main Beach
710: to Griffith University via Parkwood
714: to Griffith University via Pacific Pines
715: to Southport via Arundel
716: to Studio Village
717: to Pacific Pines
718: to Santa Barbara
TX7 (formerly 720): to Coomera station via Dreamworld, Movie World & Wet n Wild
723: to Coomera station via Oxenford
725: to Coomera station via Upper Coomera
727: to Coomera station via Reserve Road

Tram Services
Helensvale is the northern terminus of the G:Link light rail. With one tram every 7.5 minutes during weekdays from 7am to 7pm, every 10 minutes during weekends from 7am to 7pm and every 15 minutes from 5am to 7am and 7pm to midnight to Broadbeach South.

References

External links

Helensvale station Queensland's Railways on the Internet

G:link stations
Railway stations in Australia opened in 1996
Railway stations in Gold Coast City